Padhuan is a village located in Basudebpur tehsil, Bhadrak district in the state of Odisha, India.

In 2011, the population was 6,945 people with 3,423 males and 3,522 females.

References

Villages in Bhadrak district